Paco's Story is 1987 novel by Larry Heinemann. The novel is his second and it won the 1987 U.S. National Book Award for Fiction in a major surprise that has remained controversial. In particular, the New York Times was surprised by the win, soliciting commentary from other critical reviewers, like the LA Times.

References 

1987 novels
National Book Award for Fiction winning works
Novels set during the Vietnam War